Mater Dei is an elementary school for boys grades 1 through 8, conducted by Catholic laymen, in Bethesda, Maryland.

History
Mater Dei was founded in 1960. Founder Robert W. Barros III, who was headmaster until 1985, modelled the school after Saint David's School, an all-boys Catholic school in New York City. It opened with 55 students at a campus on Churchill Road in Silver Spring, Maryland, but moved to its present location in 1964, having expanded to 172 students.

Controversy over allowing women on the school's board of trustees ended with an election in which five men and three women ran for five spots. Once elected, Edward Bennett Williams stepped down in order to give his spot to a woman by default. His son, Edward "Ned" Williams, later became Mater Dei's headmaster.

Demographics
During the 2018-19 school year, Mater Dei's 230 students were 91% white, 6% black, 2% Asian, 2% Hispanic, and 1% multiracial. 88% were Catholic.

Notable alumni
 Mark Shriver, '78, politician who served in the Maryland House of Delegates and member of the Kennedy family.
 Brett Kavanaugh, '79,  United States Supreme Court Justice.
 Christopher Jarzynski, physicist who created the Jarzynski equality and professor at the University of Maryland.
 C. J. Kemp, '95, former professional lacrosse player.
 Marcus Mason, '99, former NFL player.
 George Huguely, '02, murderer.
 Markel Starks, '06, professional basketball player.
 Nate Britt, '09, professional basketball player.
 Kris Jenkins, '09, professional basketball player known for hitting a buzzer-beating shot to win the 2016 NCAA men's basketball championship for Villanova.
 Anthony Cowan, '14, basketball player.
 Hunter Dickinson, '16, basketball player.

References

External links
 Mater Dei School official website
 Mater Dei on Facebook
 Mater Dei's profile on Private School Review
 Mater Dei's profile on GreatSchools
 Mater Dei's profile on Niche

Private elementary schools in Montgomery County, Maryland
Private middle schools in Montgomery County, Maryland
Boys' schools in Maryland
Catholic schools in Maryland
Catholic elementary schools in the United States
Catholic middle schools in the United States
Educational institutions established in 1960
1960 establishments in Maryland
Catholic K–8 schools in the United States